Bernard Lawson (11 May 1927 14 December 2016), better known as Bernard Fox, was a Welsh actor. He is remembered for his roles as Dr. Bombay in the comedy fantasy series Bewitched (1964–1972), Colonel Crittendon in the comedy series Hogan's Heroes (1965–1971), Malcolm Merriweather in The Andy Griffith Show (1963–1965), Colonel Redford in Barnaby Jones (1975), Max in Herbie Goes to Monte Carlo (1977), and Archibald Gracie IV in the film Titanic (1997).

Early life
Fox was a fifth-generation performer. He was born in Port Talbot, Glamorgan, the son of Queenie (née Barrett) and Gerald Lawson, both stage actors. He had an older sister, Mavis, and his uncle was British actor Wilfrid Lawson.

Career

Film
Fox began his film career at the age of 18 months, and by age 14 was an apprentice assistant manager of a theatre. After serving with the Royal Navy in World War II and the Korean War, he resumed his acting career and appeared in over 30 cinema films from 1956 to 2004, including two cinematic dramatizations of the sinking of the doomed passenger liner the RMS Titanic, separated by 39 years, viz, Titanic (1997) (as Colonel Archibald Gracie IV) and the earlier version of the tragedy A Night to Remember (1958) (uncredited as Frederick Fleet). In the latter, he delivered the line "Iceberg dead ahead, sir!" while playing the part of the sailor in the ship's crow's nest. His other screen roles ranged from supporting parts in broad comedies (Yellowbeard, Herbie Goes to Monte Carlo, and The Private Eyes, playing a homicidal butler in the last) to supplying the voice of the Chairmouse in the Disney animated features The Rescuers and The Rescuers Down Under. He played the role of Winston Havelock, a put-out-to-grass former Royal Flying Corps airman in the 1999 adventure film The Mummy. In 2004, Fox made his final appearance in Surge of Power: The Stuff of Heroes.

Television

In 1961 he played Malcolm in all 26 episodes in the comedy series Three Live Wires.

Between 1967 and 1972, Fox portrayed the witch doctor Dr. Bombay on 18 episodes of the sitcom Bewitched. However, his first appearance on that show was not as Dr. Bombay, but as a professional witch debunker. He reprised the role of Dr. Bombay on the 1977 sequel series Tabitha, and again in 1999 on the soap opera Passions, and spoofed it as a genie doctor ("wish doctor") in a 1989 episode of Pee-wee's Playhouse. Fox was the penultimate surviving adult recurring cast member of Bewitched, leaving Nancy Kovack (who portrayed character Darrin Stephens' ex-girlfriend Sheila throughout the series) as the only remaining adult cast member upon his death; child actors Erin Murphy and David Lawrence, who portrayed Darrin and Samantha's children (Tabitha and Adam) are still alive.

Between 1965 and 1970, Fox portrayed the bumbling "Colonel" Rodney Crittendon on eight episodes of Hogan's Heroes (Crittendon is a Royal Air Force group captain, and since the United States military has no "group captain" rank, Crittendon was referred to as "colonel," the equivalent American rank to avoid confusion for the show's US audience). He appeared in two episodes in the detective mystery series Columbo, "Dagger of the Mind" and "Troubled Waters". Fox also appeared as English valet Malcolm Meriweather in three episodes of The Andy Griffith Show, and in Knight Rider as Commander Smiths in season 2, episode 8.

Fox appeared as a British Major in "The Phantom Major", episode 3 of F Troop, and in "Tea and Empathy", episode 18 of season 6 of M*A*S*H. In 1964, Fox appeared in episode 117 of The Dick Van Dyke Show, titled "Girls Will Be Boys". Fox plays the father of a little girl who keeps beating up Richie Petrie. He also appeared in "Teacher's Petrie", where he played a night school creative writing teacher, and in "Never Bathe on Saturday" as the house detective. In 1965 Fox made a guest appearance on Perry Mason as murderer Peter Stange in "The Case of the Laughing Lady".

Fox also appeared in McHale's Navy; in The Man from U.N.C.L.E. ("The Thor Affair" episode as munitions magnate Brutus Thor, intent on assassinating a "Gandhi-like" figure who's attempting to bring world peace (1966) as well as in the two-part episode "The Bridge of Lions Affair" in 1966, wherein he starred as THRUSH agent Jordin, whose constant response to each additional assignment is "I'll look into it"); and in the Murder, She Wrote episode "One White Rose for Death" in 1986. In addition, he co-starred with Michael Evans as Dr. Watson in Sherlock & Me in the early 1980s.

Personal life
Fox and his wife had two daughters, Amanda and Valerie.

Death
On the morning of 14 December 2016, Fox died of heart failure at Valley Presbyterian Hospital in Van Nuys, California. He was 89 years old.

Filmography

Film

Television

Awards and nominations

References

External links

 
 Bernard Fox at Turner Classic Movies
 
 
 

1927 births
2016 deaths
Welsh military personnel
20th-century Welsh male actors
People from Port Talbot
Royal Navy personnel of the Korean War
Royal Navy personnel of World War II
Welsh expatriates in the United States
Welsh male film actors
Welsh male television actors
Welsh male voice actors
Welsh people of English descent